Claude Nicot (12 February 1925 – 17 November 2003) was a French film actor.

Selected filmography
 Great Man (1951)
 Mammy (1951)
 The Beauty of Cadiz (1953)
 The Lady of the Camellias (1953)
 Thirteen at the Table (1955)
 Adorable Liar (1962)
 The Gardener of Argenteuil (1966)

References

Bibliography
 Goble, Alan. The Complete Index to Literary Sources in Film. Walter de Gruyter, 1999.

External links

1925 births
2003 deaths
French male stage actors
French male film actors
French male television actors
Male actors from Paris